Eacles guianensis is a moth in the family Saturniidae. It is found in Suriname, Venezuela, Guiana, French Guiana, Ecuador, and Brazil.

References

Ceratocampinae
Moths described in 1905